Forsythia may refer to:
Forsythia, a plant genus belonging to the Oleaceae (Olive family)
Forsythia (mammal), a fossil genus of flying squirrels in the family Sciuridae
"Forsythia", a song by Veruca Salt from their 1994 album American Thighs
, a US Coast Guard river tender